Sonora Reef is a reef off the west coast of Grays Harbor County, Washington, United States. It is located near the mouth of the Quinault River.
Sonora reef was named for the Sonora, a Spanish schooner captained by Juan Francisco de la Bodega y Quadra in his and Bruno de Heceta's 1775 expedition from Mexico to the Pacific Northwest.

References

External links

Landforms of Grays Harbor County, Washington